The Bruravik–Brimnes Ferry was a Norwegian ferry connection across the Hardanger Fjord between Bruravik in the municipality of Ulvik and Brimnes in the municipality of Eidfjord. The ferry connected Norwegian County Road 7 and Norwegian National Road 13, and before it was discontinued it was operated by the company Fjord1 and served by MF Sogn with up to three departures per hour. The crossing lasted about 12 minutes. In the summer of 2013 the route was also served by MF Sognefjord.

History
The route was served by HSD (later Tide Sjø) from its opening in 1934 until 2011. In 2011, Fjord 1 won a tender and took over the ferry route. In 2013 the ferry connection was replaced by the Hardanger Bridge, which opened on August 17 that year.

From the 1930s onward, road construction in the inner Hardanger Fjord progressively reduced the distance covered by the ferry:
 1934–1937: the ferry connected Ulvik and Ringøy
 1938–1940: the ferry connected Ulvik and Brimnes
 1951–1976: ferry service was resumed between Ulvik and Brimnes
 1976–2013: the ferry connected Bruravik and Brimnes
 August 17, 2013: the ferry was discontinued and replaced by the Hardanger Bridge

Ferries
The following ferries served the route:

 1952–1959: MK Kinsarvik
 1953–1957 and 1969: MF Folgefonn
 1959–1976 (not in 1966): MF Osafjord
 1966 (summer route): MF Melderskin
 1967 and 1968 (summer route): MF Rosendal
 1971–1972: MF Vikingen
 1986: MF Eidfjord
 1995–2007: MF Etne
 2007–2010: MF Melderskin
 2007–2010 (summer route): MF Bømlo
 2011–2013: MF Sogn and MF Sognefjord 
 Summer 2013: MF Gulen and MF Svanøy (for a few days in August 2013 as a replacement for MF Sogn)

References

Car ferry lines in Vestland
Fjord1
1934 establishments in Norway
2013 disestablishments in Norway